Camellia rusticana or snow camellia is a species of Camellia from Japan.

References

External links
 
 

rusticana